Perth, the capital city of the state of Western Australia, has a Mediterranean climate (Köppen climate classification Csa), with hot, dry summers and cool, wet winters. Perth has an average of 8.8 hours of sunshine per day, which equates to around 3,200 hours of annual sunshine, and 138.7 clear days annually, making it the sunniest capital city in Australia.

Classifications

Seasons

Seasons in Perth are officially defined as coinciding with calendar months, so summer starts on 1 December, autumn starts on 1 March, winter starts on 1 June and spring starts on 1 September. However, summer-like weather generally occurs from November to early April, and wintery weather can occur between May and September.

Summer

Summer is the time of year with the greatest temperature variation for Perth. Perth has colder summer nights than Sydney, Brisbane, and Darwin, however, with the highest minimum monthly temperature being , in February.

On most summer afternoons, a sea breeze, known locally as the "Fremantle Doctor", blows from the southwest, providing relief from the hot north-easterly winds. Temperatures often fall below  a few hours after the arrival of the wind change. Suburbs closer to the coast generally have lower maximum temperatures than suburbs further inland, as the sea breeze arrives later. When the sea breeze does not arrive, temperatures can reach above . The sea breeze is strongest in December and January, because the sea and land temperatures have a larger difference than in February and March.

Heat waves usually occur a few times per year where temperatures reach  and above. They are caused by slow moving high pressure systems that stay in the Great Australian Bight for a few days. They create north-easterly winds, which bring hot, dry air from the outback. The WA Department of Health defines a heat wave to be 3 or more consecutive days, where the forecast minimum and maximum temperatures average at least . The Bureau of Meteorology defines a heatwave to be three or more days of unusually high maximum and minimum temperatures. Temperatures above  occur on average 25.8 times per year, and temperatures above  occur on average 3.6 times each year. They occur most often in January and February, but they have been known to occur anytime between November and March. Most days above  only occur once or twice per heatwave. The most days in a row above  is six, which occurred from 18 to 23 January 2022. The most days in a single summer above  is 11, which occurred in the summer of 2021-22. Conversely, summers without a  day, while rare, have occurred three times in the 21st century: 2001-02, 2017-18 and 2022-23. The humidity for the most part is low when it is hot in Perth, but for the few days after a heatwave, winds are generally south to south-westerly, causing higher than usual humidity. 

Visiting the beach is a common summertime activity for Perth, particularly during heatwaves. Sun protection should be used, because the average ultraviolet index during summer is 12 (extreme). The hot, dry and sometimes windy summer conditions in Perth causes bushfires to be common in and around Perth. Minor bushfires occur around Perth most summers, and occasionally major ones can occur as well, with losses of property and sometimes lives. An example of this is the 2014 Perth Hills Bushfire.

Although summers are dry in Perth, they are not completely devoid of rain, with sporadic rainfall in the form of short-lived thunderstorms and cold fronts. Tropical cyclones have not ever hit Perth, as the sea surface temperatures are too low for tropical cyclones to exist there, however remnants of ex-tropical cyclones from the north-west of Western Australia can bring heavy rain. This happens more often from late summer to mid autumn compared to early and mid summer.

Summer has a greater number of extreme rainfall events than winter, and these have increased in number in recent years. Perth's highest one day rainfall totals are all during summer. Some notable examples of extreme weather in summer are:
2010 Western Australian storms, which hit Perth on 22 March 2010. Perth recorded  of rain, and large hail caused significant damage across the metropolitan area. This is the costliest natural disaster in Western Australian history, with the damage bill estimated at A$1.08 billion. This is the highest March one day rainfall total.
Heavy rainfall associated with a tropical low on 10 February 2017, which brought  of rain. This is the highest one day rainfall total Perth has ever recorded.

Since the mid-1970s, Perth and south-west Western Australia have experienced a greater number of extreme rainfall events in the summer months.

Autumn

Autumn is a transitional season between summer and winter. Summer conditions can last until the middle of April, and wintery conditions can appear in May. Heat waves are still common in March, with temperatures above . March and April are the most common months for the remnants of ex-tropical cyclones to impact Perth, even more so than January and February. May is generally the first month where there is much rainfall typical of winter. The temperatures are also colder, but not as cold as winter, with days in the mid-20s still common.

The sea temperatures are at their hottest in autumn. Wind speeds are less than the wind speeds in spring and summer.

Winter

Frost can occasionally form in Perth. Temperatures below  happen on average four times per year. Temperatures below  happen on average once every five years. Jandakot Airport tends to be the coldest part of Perth during winter, with temperatures below  occurring on average 14.6 times per year, and temperatures below  occurring on average 3.5 times per year.

Generally rainy days receive much rain, and they are interspersed by many sunny, clear days. The rainiest area in the metropolitan region is in the Perth Hills.

Perth's winter rainfall is influenced by the southern annular mode (SAM). When the SAM is positive, rainfall in Perth is decreased, and when the SAM is negative, rainfall in Perth is increased.

While snow has never been recorded in the Perth CBD, light snowfalls have been reported in outer suburbs of Perth in the Perth Hills around Kalamunda, Roleystone and Mundaring. The most recent snowfall was in 1968.

Spring

Spring is a transitional season between winter and summer. Rainfall lessens and temperatures increase as spring goes by. By November, summer weather occurs again, with heatwaves occurring and little rain. The earliest day above  to occur in spring is 11 November 2003, when it hit .

Wind speeds are stronger in spring than autumn.

Aboriginal seasons

The Noongar people live in the south west corner of Western Australia, including Perth. The Noongar calendar has six seasons. The months listed here are approximate, as the Noongar seasons are based on what is happening with the weather rather than dates on a calendar.

Birak – December to January. Hot and dry. Easterly winds in the morning and sea breezes in the afternoon.
Bunuru – February to March. Hottest part of the year with little to no rain. Hot easterly winds and cooling sea breeze on most afternoons close to the coast.
Djeran – April to May. Cooler weather starts. Cool nights cause dew in the mornings. Lighter breezes from the south. Rainy days occur.
Makuru – June to July. Coldest and wettest part of the year. More frequent storms occur.
Djilba – August to September. Transitional time of year with a mix of cold, warm, rain and clear.
Kambarang – October to November. Longer dry periods and warmer weather.

Climate change

In 2090, Perth is predicted to have the rainfall of Yanchep today and the temperature of Geraldton today using the RCP 4.5 scenario. Perth may see the number of days above  increase from 28 per year on average to 36 in 2030, and to between 40 and 63 in 2090. While frost days will decrease. Rainfall will increase in intensity while decreasing on average. Drought days in the south west as a whole may increase by as much as 80% versus 20% for Australia. The danger from fire will increase with more fire days for all of Western Australia.

Weather stations

The official weather station for Perth is the Perth Metro station, which is operated by the Bureau of Meteorology (BoM) and opened in 1993. Prior to that, Perth's official weather station was at the BoM Perth Regional Office in various different locations in Perth, West Perth and East Perth.

Other weather stations in the Perth metropolitan region are located at Perth Airport, Bickley, Garden Island, Gooseberry Hill, Hillarys Boat Harbour, Jandakot Airport, Millendon (Swan Valley), Bullsbrook (RAAF Base Pearce), Rottnest Island, Gosnells and Swanbourne.

Climate data

Daylight

UV Index

Sea temperature

See also 
 Climate change in Australia
 Climate of Australia
 Environment of Australia

References 

Perth, Western Australia
Perth